Moon Lake is an unincorporated area in Pasco County, Florida. Moon Lake Road passes through the area. Moon Lake was once home to the Moon Lake Gardens Dude Ranch, built between 1933 and 1937 by the owner of Clearwater, Florida's Fort Harrison Hotel, Ed Haley. The tourist resort included cottages, a casino, and gardens. Moon Lake's elementary school scored an A on state evaluations. At 4,458, it has 75% of its population from lower income homes.

References

External links
Moon Lake, Florida (History of Pasco County)

Census-designated places in Pasco County, Florida
Census-designated places in Florida